Richard O'Neill may refer to:

 Richard O'Neill (author) (born 1943), Anglo-Irish author and editor
 Richard O'Neill (politician) (1847–1908), Australian politician
 Richard W. O'Neill (1897–1982), U.S. Army soldier and Medal of Honor recipient
 Wally O'Neill (Richard Wallace O'Neill, 1902–1974), American football player
 Dick O'Neill (Richard Francis O'Neill), American character actor